Andreas Schlotterbeck (born 2 March 1982) is a German water polo player who competed in the 2008 Summer Olympics.

References

1982 births
Living people
German male water polo players
Olympic water polo players of Germany
Water polo players at the 2008 Summer Olympics